The Legio I Illyricorum was a Roman Legion stationed in Qasr el-Azraq and Palmyra; it is mentioned in the Notitia Dignitatum. According to many ancient sources, it was stationed within the Eastern Half of the Roman Empire, under emperor Aurelian.

History 
This Legio I Ilyricorum was founded by the Roman Emperor Aurelian. The legion was made up entirely of soldiers who lived near the Danube river. In either 272 or 273 the legion would fight under Aurelian against the Palmyrene Empire. After the defeat of the Palmyrene Empire the legion remained in the east. They were based in Qasr el-Azraq and garrisoned Palmyra. The purpose of the legion was to prevent any more uprisings. During Diocletian's and Galerius' reigns the legion was transferred to the Camp of Diocletian near Palmyra. During the reign of emperor Licinius soldiers from the I Illyricorum would be transferred to Egypt and Cyrene. The commander of the soldiers at the time was Victorinus. Later, the Legion was transferred back to Palmyra. Sometime in the third century a unit of Moorish cavalry from the I Illyricorum would replace the Legio X Fretensis in Eilat.

Attested members

See also
List of Roman legions

References 

01 Illyricorum
Comitatenses
Military units and formations established in the 3rd century